The Greyhound of the Year Awards are the annual awards for the leading greyhounds in the United Kingdom.

The British Greyhound Breeders & Owners Association inaugurated the Silver Greyhound Awards in 1951 and every year the winners were announced at the annual dinner and ball at the Dorchester Hotel. In 1970 the voting switched to the Greyhound Trainers & Breeders Association and the venue changed to the London Hilton on Park Lane. In 1982 the Greyhound Writers Association took over the voting and today the awards are now known as the Greyhound Board of Great Britain annual awards which are held at a different venue every year.

On 14 February 2021, the 2020 awards were held as virtual event due to the lockdown that was in place as a consequence of COVID-19.

Past winners

Main Award

Sprinter Award

Standard Award

Stayer Award

Marathon Award

Newcomer Award

British Bred Award

Dam Award

Bitch Award

Hurdles Award

See also
Irish Greyhound of the Year Awards

References

Greyhound racing competitions in the United Kingdom